Calliostoma funiculatum is a species of sea snail, a marine gastropod mollusk in the family Calliostomatidae.

Distribution
This species occurs in the Mediterranean Sea off Sicily, Italy.

References

External links
To World Register of Marine Species

funiculatum
Gastropods described in 2011